USS Annabelle (SP-1206), also spelled Anna Belle, was a United States Navy patrol vessel in commission from 1917 to 1918.

Annabelle was built in 1898 as a private motorboat of the same name by John Archie. On 15 June 1917, the U.S. Navy chartered her from her owner, Mr. W. J. Mathewes of Chincoteague, Virginia, for use as a section patrol vessel during World War I. She was commissioned as USS Annabelle or Anna Belle (SP-1206) on 16 August 1917.

Assigned to the 5th Naval District, Annabelle served on section patrol duties in the Norfolk, Virginia-Hampton Roads area until returned to Matthewes on 20 December 1918.

Notes

References

Department of the Navy Naval History and Heritage Command Online Library of Selected Images: Civilian Ships: Anna Belle (American Motor Boat, 1898). Served as USS Anna Belle (SP-1206) in 1917-1918
NavSource Online: Section Patrol Craft Photo Archive: Annabelle (SP 1206)

Patrol vessels of the United States Navy
World War I patrol vessels of the United States
1898 ships